Herbert Evans (16 April 1882 – 10 February 1952) was an English film actor. He appeared in over 180 films between 1916 and 1952.

Biography
Evans started his acting career in 1914 at the World Film Company in Fort Lee, New Jersey.

His performances include the Earl of Glenheather Castle in The Three Stooges comedy The Hot Scots and its remake Scotched in Scotland, the well-meaning but clueless butler Wilkes in Vagabond Loafers’’ and in the Our Gang short Shrimps for a Day.

In addition to his work in short subjects, Evans appeared—often uncredited—in such films as Casablanca, Strangers on a Train, Annie Get Your Gun and Song of the Thin Man. He also had bit roles in the Shirley Temple vehicles Curly Top and Wee Willie Winkie.

Evans died on 10 February 1952 shortly after filming for The Brigand was completed. He was survived by his wife Etta and two children.

Selected filmography

 Where Love Leads (1916)
 The Heart of a Hero (1916)
 The Wild Girl (1917)
 Who Loved Him Best? (1918)
 The Third Degree (1919)
 The Place of Honeymoons (1920)
 The Devil Dancer (1927)
 Beyond London Lights (1928)
 The Woman Who Dared (1933)
 Ship of Wanted Men (1933)
 Service with a Smile (1934)
 The Widow from Monte Carlo (1935)
 And Sudden Death (1936)
 High Flyers (1937)
 Saleslady (1938)
 Everybody's Doing It (1938)
 The Dawn Patrol (1938)
 The Rains Came (1939)
 Sherlock Holmes and the Voice of Terror (1942)
 Appointment in Berlin (1943)
 The Gang's All Here (1943)
 Ladies of Washington (1944)
 A Fig Leaf for Eve (1944)
 The Fabulous Suzanne (1946)
 Jiggs and Maggie in Society'' (1947)

References

External links

1882 births
1952 deaths
English male film actors
English male silent film actors
Male actors from London
20th-century English male actors
British expatriate male actors in the United States